Rob Hoadley (born 28 March 1980) is a former English rugby union player and former head coach of the San Diego Legion of Major League Rugby (MLR).

Professional career
Hoadley was born in Hammersmith, London, England. He joined London Irish in 1999, spending five seasons with the club and winning the Powergen Cup in 2002. 

In 2004, Hoadley moved away from London Irish to join rivals London Wasps. During his time at London Wasps the club won the 2004-05 Zurich Premiership (in the final of which he scored a try), 2005–06 Anglo-Welsh Cup, 2006-07 Heineken Cup, 2007–08 Guinness Premiership.

Coaching career

Hoadley joined the coaching staff at London Wasps in 2009 as a Defence Coach. Hoadley was appointed Defence Coach for the Wales under-20 team in 2009.

Hoadley was the backs coach for the United States national team during the 2016 Americas Rugby Championship.
Hoadley was announced as assistant coach for the San Diego Breakers in early 2016.

References

External links
Wasps profile

1980 births
Living people
Wasps RFC players
People from Hammersmith
Major League Rugby coaches
San Diego Legion